Sergio Alberto Estrada Cajigal Ramírez (August 23, 1961 in Cuernavaca, Morelos) is a Mexican politician, who was Governor of the state of Morelos for the National Action Party from 2000 - 2006, and who served two periods as mayor of Cuernavaca. His grandfather Vicente Estrada Cajigal was the governor of Morelos from 1930-1935. In 2009 he left the NAP and in 2012 he supported the candidate for Governorship of PRI. Since leaving the governorship he has been embroiled in some highly publicized legal and political controversies, but has not been indicted for any wrong-doings.

Mayor of Cuernavaca
Sergio Estrada Cajigal was the first opposition-party Presidente Municipal (municipal president or mayor) elected in Cuernavaca's history (1997-2000). He solved a waste collection crisis by privatizing the service, and his administration was known for numerous public works projects, such as street paving and the construction of a bridge on the north side of the city.

Governor of Morelos
Estrada Cajigal was the first opposition governor of the state of Morelos (2000-2006).

A licensed helicopter pilot, Estrada Cajigal became embroiled in controversy when he rented a helicopter for use by the state, supposedly to improve police and emergency functions. The governor was often seen flying the helicopter, accompanied by female friends; the press soon dubbed it the Helicóptero del Amor ("Helicopter of Love").

As governor, Estrada Cajigal was accused of having links to drug cartels and a car-theft ring, as well as misuse of funds, although he denied such links and no charges were ever filed.

Due to changing markets, Estrada Cajigal supported the shift of the state's agricultural base away from sugarcane production to that of ornamental flowers for exportation. The governor was accused of supporting expropriation of communal farmlands in favor of large businesses and as ex-governor, for personal gain in the Ejido of Acapantzingo. He says the land "was gifted" (fue regalado) by Eduardo Moreno Ramos, son of a local landowner.

The administration of Estrada Cagijal was also known for its inexperience and political repression, particularly in the municipality of Tlalnepantla and when ecologists opposed the conversion of the former hotel Casino de la Selva into a retail property. Juliana Quintanilla, of the Comisión Independiente de Derechos Humanos de Morelos ("Independent Human Rights Commission of Morelos) accused his administration of more than 10 violent evictions and more than 1,500 complaints of human rights abuses. On the other hand, Jorge Messeguer claims that Estrada has looked the other way at organized crime in Huitzilac, where illegal logging, car theft, drug trafficking, and kidnapping are common.

Dispute with father
In an article in La Jornada published December 26, 2019, Sergio Estrada Cajigal Barrera claims that his two sons, Vicente and Sergio Estrada Cajigal Ramirez, have falsified documents, leaving him penniless.

See also
 List of people from Morelos, Mexico

References 

1961 births
Living people
Governors of Morelos
National Action Party (Mexico) politicians
People from Cuernavaca
People from Morelos
Politicians from Morelos
20th-century Mexican politicians
21st-century Mexican politicians
Municipal presidents in Morelos